Survive is an American streaming television series written by Richard Abate and Jeremy Ungar that debuted on Quibi on April 6, 2020. It is based on the novel of the same name by Alex Morel.

Premise 
Two ordinary people, Jane and Paul, are the only survivors of a plane crash that isolates them on a remote snow-covered mountain.

Soon this unlikely duo will have to find a way to get back to society as Jane herself struggles with depression and her own personal demons while Paul does everything to try and keep her safe.

Cast 
 Sophie Turner as Jane
 Corey Hawkins as Paul
 Terence Maynard as Doctor M
 Laurel Marsden as Kara
 Elliott Wooster as Phil
 Lewis Hayes as Chad
 Makgotso M as New Girl
 Jennifer Martin as Nurse Leslie
 Marta Timofeeva as Young Jane
 Jo Stone-Fewings as Jane’s Father
 Caroline Goodall as Jane’s Mother

Episodes

Reception 
On Rotten Tomatoes, the series has a 58% rating with an average score of 6.94 out of 10 based on 26 reviews. The site's critical consensus read: "Though Survive struggles under the weight of its subject matter and limited runtime, it's further proof that the incredibly talented Sophie Turner is worthy of bigger, better roles."

Accolades

References

External links 
 
 

Quibi original programming
2020s American drama television series
2020 American television series debuts
English-language television shows
American drama web series